Laxman Pawar is a leader of Bharatiya Janata Party and a member of the Maharashtra Legislative Assembly elected from Georai Assembly constituency in Beed city.

Positions held
 2019: Elected to Maharashtra Legislative Assembly.

References

Living people
Members of the Maharashtra Legislative Assembly
Bharatiya Janata Party politicians from Maharashtra
People from Beed
Year of birth missing (living people)